Bungert is a surname. Notable people with the surname include:

 August Bungert (1845–1915), German opera composer and poet
 Niko Bungert (born 1986), German footballer
 Wilhelm Bungert (born 1939), German tennis player